Automated fiber placement (AFP), also known as advanced fiber placement, is an advanced method of manufacturing composite materials. These materials, which offer lighter weight with equivalent or greater strength than metals, are increasingly used in airframes and other industrial products.

Fiber Placement is an automated composites manufacturing process of heating and compacting synthetic resin pre-impregnated non-metallic fibers on typically complex tooling mandrels. The fiber usually comes in the form of what are referred to as "tows". Fiber placement machines (FPM) generally have a capacity of 12 to 32 tows or when placing all tows at a time in a course, have respective course widths of 1.5 in to 4 in. The tows are fed to a heater and compaction roller on the FPM head and through robotic type machine movements, are placed in courses across a tool surface. Courses are generally placed in orientations of 0°, +45°, -45° and 90° to build up plies which in combination, have good properties in all directions. Fiber placement machines are generally rated in (lb/h), (lb/min) or weight per time.

Description
Automated fiber placement (AFP) machines are a recent development of composite manufacturing technologies meant to increase rate and precision in the production of advanced composite parts. AFP machines place fiber reinforcements on moulds or mandrels in an automatic fashion and use a number of separate small width tows (typically  or less) of thermoset or thermoplastic pre-impregnated materials to form composite layups. This technology allows better precision and increased deposition rates when compared with experienced laminators but, while allowing for more complex layup geometries than Automated Tape Laying (ATL) it does not reach the same deposition rates. Automated fiber placement can be used to manufacture complex structures that are not possible to manufacture with any other methods.

See also 
 Composite material
 Tailored Fiber Placement (TFP)
 Ingersoll Machine Tools

References

Composite material fabrication techniques